Child 44 is a 2015 mystery thriller film directed by Daniel Espinosa, written by Richard Price, and based on Tom Rob Smith's 2008 novel of the same name. The film stars an ensemble cast featuring Tom Hardy, Gary Oldman, Noomi Rapace, Joel Kinnaman, Paddy Considine, Jason Clarke, and Vincent Cassel. It was released on 17 April 2015. Both the novel and the film are very loosely based on the case of Soviet serial killer Andrei Chikatilo. The film was a box office bomb, grossing just $13 million against its $50 million budget.

Plot
During Stalin's rule of the Soviet Union in the early 1950s, Ministry of State Security (MGB) Agent and war hero Leo Demidov uncovers a strange and brutal series of child murders. MGB leadership refuses to acknowledge the deaths as murders, however, because Soviet doctrine states that only capitalism creates serial killers. The son of Leo's partner is murdered by the serial killer, and during Leo's investigation, his wife, Raisa, is accused of being disloyal to the state. Leo suspects that his amoral and ambitious enemy in the MGB, Vasili Nikitin, is behind the charges. Leo refuses to support the accusation, and he is forced to take a demeaning militia position in the town of Volsk. Raisa accompanies him and must work as a janitor. 

In Volsk Leo meets his new commander, General Nesterov. Meanwhile, Vasili calls Raisa and attempts to persuade her to leave Leo and join him in Moscow. When she refuses, Vasili orders a local MGB man to abuse her. Raisa later admits to Leo that she only agreed to marry him because she feared what would happen to her if she refused a high-ranking member of state security. 

More child murder victims are discovered in Volsk, and after Leo tells Raisa that he suspects a serial killer, she decides to help his investigation. Together they convince Nesterov and his wife, Inessa, that the deaths must be investigated as serial murder. Further investigation reveals that the killer has claimed at least 44 victims and that he is traveling the rail lines to find his targets. 

Leo and Raisa travel in secret to Moscow to interview a woman who reported seeing the killer. The interview does not bear fruit, however, and to escape possible pursuit by the MGB, they seek out Raisa's former colleague. However, during the meeting Raisa discovers that the colleague is an informer, and Leo kills him. Leo tells Raisa that she can leave him if she wishes, but she says that she wants to stay with him.

Leo and Raisa return to Volsk, but there they discover that Vasili and his men have pursued them for killing the informer. They are arrested and interrogated, then put on a train to a work camp. During the train ride, they are attacked by killers at the order of Vasili; after killing their assailants, Leo and Raisa jump off the train. They trek to Rostov, where the highest concentration of the serial killer's victims has been found; they reason that the killer must work close to the rail yards there.

In the Rostov tractor factory, Leo identifies the killer by cross-referencing worker travel with the location and date of the murders. Leo and Raisa corner the killer, who surrenders to them. However, the killer is suddenly shot in the head by Vassili, who has followed Leo and Raisa. Vassili tries to execute them, but after a vicious struggle, they kill Vassili. Leo cleverly tells the MGB agents who arrive that the serial killer killed Vassili and that he then shot the killer. Because the serial killer was a POW in German camps, the MGB is able to (falsely) explain away his actions as those of a Nazi agent.

Leo is reinstated in Moscow; despite being offered a promising political position, he instead asks to create and lead a homicide division in Moscow. Leo and Raisa adopt two orphan girls.

Cast

 Tom Hardy as Captain Leo Demidov
 Gary Oldman as General Mikhail Nesterov
 Noomi Rapace as Raisa Demidova
 Joel Kinnaman as Senior Lieutenant (later Captain) Vasili Nikitin
 Vincent Cassel as Major Kuzmin
 Jason Clarke as Anatoly Brodsky
 Paddy Considine as Vladimir Malevich
 Josef Altin as Alexander
 Sam Spruell as Doctor Tyapkin
 Ned Dennehy as The Coroner
 Fares Fares as Lieutenant Alexei Andreyev
 Nikolaj Lie Kaas as Ivan Sukov
 Mark Lewis Jones as Tortoise
 Anna Rust as Sasha
 Xavier Atkins as Pavel
 Sonny Ashbourne Serkis as Artur
 Kevin Clarke as MGB Agent
 Petr Vanek as Fyodor
 Max Rowntree as Andrej 
 David Bowles as Volsk Investigator 2 (uncredited)
 Michael Nardone as Semyon Okun
 Fedja Stukan as Sergei
 Anssi Lindström as Alexander Pickup
 Harmon Joseph as Vadim
 Charles Dance as Major Grachev
 Tara Fitzgerald as Inessa Nesterova
 Samuel Buttery as Varlan Babinic
 Agnieszka Grochowska as Nina Andreeva

Production
Principal photography began in June 2013 in the cities of Prague, Ostrava, and Kladno in the Czech Republic, and continued in Romania. For the brief scene in the Moscow underground the Prague metro was used. It was the first time in its history that it was shut to the public.

Ban in some former USSR republics 
On 15 April 2015, the Russian film distributor Central Partnership announced that the film would be withdrawn from cinemas in Russia, although some media stated that screening of the film was blocked by the Russian Ministry of Culture. The decision was made following the press screening the day before. The Ministry of Culture and the Central Partnership issued a joint press release stating that the screening of the film before the 70th anniversary of the Victory Day was unacceptable. The Ministry of Culture claimed that it received several questions on the film's contents, primarily concerning "distortion of historical facts, peculiar treatment of events before, during and after the Great Patriotic War and images and characters of Soviet people of that era". Russian minister of culture Vladimir Medinsky welcomed the decision, but stressed that it was made solely by the Central Partnership. However, in his personal statement Medinsky complained that the film depicts Russians as "physically and morally base sub-humans", and compared the depiction of Soviet Union in the film with J. R. R. Tolkien's Mordor, and wished that such films should be screened neither before the 70th anniversary of the victory in the Great Patriotic War, nor any other time. However, he also stated that the film would be available in Russia on DVD and online.

The film was also withdrawn from cinemas due to distributor’s decision   in Belarus, Ukraine, Kazakhstan, and Kyrgyzstan, while release of the film was postponed until October in Georgia.

Ukrainian film director and producer Alexander Rodnyansky criticised the decision not to release Child 44 as bad for the country's film industry. "Before, films where Soviet and Russian heroes were presented not in the best way have been released in Russia, but nothing similar happened. Now everything to do with history should clearly fit into a kind of framework set by the culture ministry."

As the Baltic states of Estonia, Latvia and Lithuania were occupied by the Soviet Union and as members of the EU, they officially received the film release.

Reception
On Rotten Tomatoes, Child 44 has an approval rating of 27%, based on 82 reviews, with an average score of 4.82/10. The site's critical consensus reads, "There's a gripping story at the heart of Child 44 and a solid performance from Tom Hardy in the lead, but it all still adds up to a would-be thriller that lacks sufficient thrills." On Metacritic, the film has a score of 41 out of 100, based on 25 critics, indicating "mixed or average reviews".

Writing in The Guardian, Peter Bradshaw gave the film 2 stars out of 5 and reported that "Tom Rob Smith's page-turning bestseller from 2008 has been turned into a heavy, indigestible meal of a film, full of actors speaking English with very heavy Russian accents – actors from England, Sweden, Lebanon, Poland, Australia, almost anywhere but Russia". Bradshaw added: "Tom Hardy brings his robust, muscular presence to the role of Leo and he is watchable enough, but the forensic and psychological aspects are just dull; there is no fascination in the detection process. […] Everything is immersed in a cloudy brown soup". Also in The Guardian, reviewer Phil Hoad wrote: "Child 44 has a fascinating premise and setting [but] failed to convincingly package this as either an upscale thriller along the lines of Tinker Tailor Soldier Spy, as implied by a powerhouse cast also featuring Gary Oldman, Noomi Rapace and Paddy Considine; or as something racier à la The Girl with the Dragon Tattoo or Gone Girl (indeed, the film itself falls awkwardly between these two stools)". Hoad added, "[a]s for the debacle over the Slavic-slathered English spoken by the entire cast, it further highlights the uncertainty about whether Child 44 was intended for the multiplex or the arthouse. Presumably a decision made to placate the former, opting to turn the film into an Iron Curtain version of 'Allo 'Allo damaged its integrity. Aren't we past this kind of cultural bastardisation? It is possible for foreign-language films to cross over: The Lives of Others, which meted out its own totalitarian intrigue in German, took $66m overseas – the kind of cash Child 44 will never see".

In The Observer, Jonathan Romney found, "In writer Richard Price's boil-down of the labyrinthine original, the whodunit loses all momentum" adding that "the whole thing is scuppered by having everyone speak in borscht-thick Russian accents" before concluding that, "[the film is] shot in several shades of Volga mud and drags like a Thursday afternoon in Nizhniy Novgorod".

References

External links
 
 

2015 films
2010s mystery thriller films
2010s serial killer films
American mystery thriller films
British mystery thriller films
Czech mystery thriller films
2010s English-language films
English-language Czech films
English-language Romanian films
Films about child abduction
Films about child abuse
Films based on British novels
Films based on thriller novels
Eastern Front of World War II films
Films directed by Daniel Espinosa
Films with screenplays by Richard Price (writer)
Films scored by Jon Ekstrand
Films set in 1953
Films set in Moscow
Films set in Russia
Films set in the Soviet Union
Films shot in the Czech Republic
Lionsgate films
Romanian thriller films
British serial killer films
American serial killer films
Scott Free Productions films
Summit Entertainment films
Worldview Entertainment films
Censored films
Film controversies in Russia
Film controversies in Belarus
Film controversies in Ukraine
Film controversies in Kazakhstan
Film controversies in Kyrgyzstan
Film censorship in Russia
Film censorship in Belarus
Film censorship in Ukraine
Film censorship in Kazakhstan
Film censorship in Kyrgyzstan
Films about the Holodomor
2010s American films
2010s British films
Czech serial killer films